Cereopsius ziczac is a species of beetle in the family Cerambycidae. It was described by Matsushita in 1940. It is known from Taiwan.

References

Cereopsius
Beetles described in 1940